Merom Generating Station is a 2-unit, 1080 MW rated coal-fired power plant located between Merom, Indiana, and Sullivan, Indiana, which has been in operation since 1982. It is owned by Hallador Energy Company, who acquired it from Hoosier Energy effective October 21, 2022.

On January 21, 2020, Hoosier Energy announced that the company expected to retire the facility in 2023. On February 15, 2022, Hoosier Energy and Hallador announced that Hallador would acquire the generating station.

Environmental impact

Air pollution
 2006 CO2 Emissions: 7,064,920 tons
 2006 SO2 Emissions: 14,847 tons
 2006 NOx Emissions: 7,808 tons
 2005 Mercury Emissions:

Legal settlement
In July 2010 a settlement agreement was reached between the U.S. Environmental Protection Agency and Hoosier Energy to reduce emissions that are regulated under the Clean Air Act.  The settlement included a civil penalty and a commitment to upgrade the air pollution controls at two power plants in Indiana, Merom Generating Station and Frank E. Ratts Generating Station.

See also

 List of power stations in Indiana
 Global warming

References

External links
 Hallador Power Company
 Merom Generating Station at SourceWatch

Energy infrastructure completed in 1982
Energy infrastructure completed in 1983
Buildings and structures in Sullivan County, Indiana
Coal-fired power stations in Indiana
1982 establishments in Indiana